The fern flower is a magic flower in Baltic mythology, in Estonian mythology and in Slavic mythology.

Tradition 
According to the myth, this flower blooms for a very short time on the eve of the summer solstice (celebrated on June 21 or sometimes July 7). It brings fortune to the person who finds it. In some tales, it allows animal speech understanding. It is closely guarded by evil spirits and its picker can have earthly riches, which have never benefited anyone, so some leave it alone.

Estonian and Baltic
In the Estonian, Lithuanian and Latvian tradition, the fern flower is supposed to appear only on the night of 23 to 24 June during the celebration of the summer solstice which is called Jāņi in Latvia, Joninės or Rasos in Lithuania, Jaaniõhtu or Jaaniöö in Estonia and juhannus in Finland. The celebration has pre-Christian origins. In addition to the idea that the finder of the fern flower will become rich or happy, here, the fern flower is sometimes perceived a symbol of fertility. During this supposedly magical night, young couples go into the woods "seeking the fern flower", which is most commonly read as a euphemism for sex. Sex can lead to pregnancy; the child could be thought of as the fern flower.

Referring to this tradition, Papardes zieds ("fern flower" in Latvian) is  the name of an NGO in Latvia that promotes education about matters pertaining to sexuality, fertility, and relationships.

Swedish 
Similar beliefs are attested in Sweden, where the fern flower was said to be found only at midnight on Midsummer's Eve, and even then was protected by magic and thus hard to obtain. This also applied to horsetail and daphne flowers; of daphne, a flowering plant, it was said: "The flowers are a rarity if picked on nights when they are believed to bloom. The naturally occurring flowers no one believes to be daphne flowers."

Slavic 

In Russia, Ukraine, Belarus and Poland, the holiday is practiced on the eve of Ivan Kupala Day. Young girls wear wreaths in their hair and couples go into the woods searching for the fern flower. When they come out of the woods, if the male is wearing the girl's wreath, it means the couple is engaged to be married.

According to folklore, the flower is Chervona Ruta. The flower is yellow, but according to legend, it turns red on the eve of Ivan Kupala Day.

Blooming ferns 

Ferns are not flowering plants, but the myth may be rooted in a reality when the grouping of plants was not exactly the same as the modern taxonomy. Numerous flowering plants resemble ferns, or have fern-like foliage, and some open flowers during nighttime. Some true ferns, like Osmunda regalis, have sporangia in tight clusters (termed "fertile fronds") which may appear in flower-like clusters and so be commonly known as "flowering ferns".

See also
 Blue flower
 "St. John's Eve"

Notes

References

Mythological plants
Slavic mythology
Baltic mythology
Flowers in religion